Gyeong Dae-seung (Hangul: 경대승, Hanja: 慶大升) (1154 – 4 August 1183) was the third of many military dictators who ruled during the late period of the Goryeo. Unlike his predecessors, General Gyeong was determined to fix Goryeo's problems and help the people prosper. His popularity with the people aroused the jealousy of King Myeongjong of Goryeo. His military dictatorship over Goryeo signified a brief period of peace within the war-ravaged kingdom.

Background 
General Gyeong Dae-Seung was born to Gyeong Jin into the Cheongju Gyeong clan in the year 1154. At the time of his birth, the warrior-class of the nation was highly undermined and deprived of the luxuries that its civilian and scholar counterparts were able to see excessively. The young Gyeong began his military training at the age of 15, and served under the regimes of both Yi Ui-bang and Jeong Jung-bu. When his father died, he took charge of his household and began helping the poor, and made the decision of using the private army, Tobang that his father had built.

Dictator 
In 1179, the young General Gyeong led a revolt against the current-reigning dictator Jeong Jung-bu, killing his son and son-in-law in the process of overthrowing the regime. At the age of 26, Gyeong had overthrown the powerful Jeong military regime and had become the undisputed military dictator of Goryeo. The greatest help to Gyeong was his lifelong friend General Kim Ja-Gyuk, who wanted to put Gyeong on the Imperial throne. Gyeong did not allow such things to overcome his original purpose for taking power. Gyeong Dae-seung became very popular among the people and received the name, "Righteous, young general." Emperor Myeongjong became jealous of Gyeong's popularity and power, and rejected the young general as merely another bloodthirsty barbaric warrior who was greedy for power. Despite efforts to restore peace, Gyeong was faced with assassination attempts, the most notable being an attempt by his friend Kim Ja-Gyuk to poison him. This attempt failed and Gyeong was the military dictator of Goryeo for five years until he became ill (possibly tuberculosis) that eventually killed him.

Death and aftermath 
Gyeong Dae-seung died in August 1183. With the death of Gyeong, Yi Ui-bang's former lieutenant Yi Ui-min returned to Kaesong and took power over Goryeo, undoing Gyeong's legacy.

Popular culture
 Portrayed by Park Yong-woo in the 2003-2004 KBS TV series Age of Warriors.

See also 
Jeong Jung-bu
Goryeo

References

1154 births
1183 deaths
Goryeo Buddhists
Korean generals
Regents of Korea
Leaders who took power by coup